The Varna Opera is an opera house in Varna, Bulgaria. It is part of the Opera and Philharmonic Society of Varna, founded by a merger of the Opera House and Philharmonic Society in 1999. The theatre itself originally opened in 1947.

History
The history of the theatre, currently known as the Varna Opera Theater, dates back to 1912 when the foundation was laid for the theatre. Its creation was temporarily delayed due to the coming Balkan Wars. After the wars ended, the theatre was inaugurated in 1932. It was registered under the title of the Varna Public Opera House on April 6, 1947 and was officially opened on August 1 of the same year. Stefan Nikolaev was appointed as the theatre's first director and Peter Raichev, a distinguished Bulgarian singer, was invited to be the first art director.

An orchestra, a choir and a ballet group were formed under the leadership of the young conductor Raichev, the choir-master Dimiter Mladenov and the choreographer Assen Manolov. Aside from the theatre's usual participation in opera productions and children's music shows, the corps de ballet stages ballet productions. The Varna Opera Corps de ballet has had many tours in Greece, India, Egypt, Germany, Austria, Switzerland and Romania.

Orchestra
The story of the Varna Philharmonic began in 1913, when an amateur symphony orchestra was founded. In 1926, it participated with great success under the direction of Assen Naidenov. Today, the Symphony Orchestra has participated in every prestigious Bulgarian festival and has toured Germany, the Czech Republic, Slovakia, France, Russia, Poland, Austria, Spain, and Italy, amongst several others. The orchestra has since made many recordings for Bulgarian national radio and national television.

References

External links
 Opera Varna

Buildings and structures in Varna, Bulgaria
Culture in Varna, Bulgaria
Tourist attractions in Varna, Bulgaria
Opera houses in Bulgaria
Symphony orchestras
Theatres completed in 1947
Music venues completed in 1947